In probability theory, the probability distribution of the sum of two or more independent random variables is the convolution of their individual distributions. The term is motivated by the fact that the probability mass function or probability density function of a sum of independent random variables is the convolution of their corresponding probability mass functions or probability density functions respectively. Many well known distributions have simple convolutions. The following is a list of these convolutions. Each statement is of the form

Discrete distributions

Continuous distributions 

 

The following three statements are special cases of the above statement:

 
 
 

 
 
 
 

 
 

Mixed distributions:

See also
Algebra of random variables
Relationships among probability distributions
Infinite divisibility (probability)
 Bernoulli distribution
 Binomial distribution
 Cauchy distribution
 Erlang distribution
 Exponential distribution
 Gamma distribution
 Geometric distribution
 Hypoexponential distribution
 Lévy distribution
 Poisson distribution
 Stable distribution
 Mixture distribution
 Sum of normally distributed random variables

References

Sources

Convolutions
Probability distributions, convolutions
Probability distributions, convolutions